Stephen Rigaud (25 November 1856 – 13 November 1922) was an Australian cricketer. He played in one first-class match for South Australia in 1877/78.

See also
 List of South Australian representative cricketers

References

External links
 

1856 births
1922 deaths
Australian cricketers
South Australia cricketers
Cricketers from Adelaide